Off Campus College Transport, Inc., or OCCT, is Binghamton University's student driven, managed, and operated bus service for Binghamton University students, faculty, and staff. OCCT offers "safe, reliable, convenient, consistent, and courteous transportation to the Binghamton University community." OCCT offers additional services such as Lift service for passengers with disabilities and Charter services for organizations and groups associated with Binghamton University. The transportation service is provided at no additional cost to students, although service is paid for through fees collected with tuition. The Company is a wholly-owned subsidiary of The Student Association of Binghamton University, Inc.

History 

OCCT from its founding was run as a fully democratic, student-owned and operated cooperative until 1995. That summer, a lock-out followed when the student cooperative voted to shut down during the summer until the university administration backed off of its attempts to install a new coordinator. 

The organization is currently run by a full-time Director. The Board of Directors consists of both voting and non-voting members from the Student Association at Binghamton University and the Binghamton University administration. Funding for service is provided by the student transportation fee, which is collected with tuition, by the Student Association, and by the Graduate Student Organization. The Board of Directors is chaired by the Student Association Vice President for Finance. In 2015, OCCT released an app, ETA SPOT, to provide real time tracking for their bus service.

Routes
OCCT services the campus and has routes throughout Vestal, Binghamton, and Johnson City.
 UDC Shuttle (UDC)
 Campus Shuttle (CS)
 Downtown Express (DE)
 ITC Shuttle (ITC)
 ITC-UClub (ITC/UC)
 Westside Shuttle Outbound(WS OUT)
 Westside Shuttle Inbound (WS IN)
 Downtown Center-Leroy Outbound (DCL OUT) 
 Downtown Center-Leroy Inbound (DCL IN)
 Leroy Southside (LRS)
 Oakdale Mall Shuttle (OAK)
 Riviera Ridge – Town Square Mall (RRT)
 UClub Shuttle (UC)
 Main Street Shuttle Outbound (MS OUT)
 Main Street Shuttle Inbound (MS IN)

Fleet

Current Fleet
2018-2022 Thomas Saf-T-Liner C2 Powertrain Integration 8.0L
2014-2017 Thomas Saf-T-Liner C2 Cummins 6.7L
2016-2018 Ford E-450 18 Passenger Shuttle Bus 6.8L
2012 Vehicle Production Group MV-1

Retired Fleet
2015 Thomas Saf-T-Liner C2 Cummins 6.7L
2011-2012 Champion Bus Incorporated Freightliner M2 Defender Cummins 6.7L
2008 Ford E-350 ElDorado Aerotech (Lift) 6.8L
2003-2006 Thomas Saf-T-Liner HDX 
Thomas Saf-T-Liner ER
Thomas Saf-T-Liner TL960

Administrative vehicles 
Chevrolet Silverado
Toyota Highlander Hybrid
Ford Focus
2009 Chevrolet Express 12 Passenger 6.0L

References 

Binghamton University
Bus transportation in the United States
Organizations established in 1971
Bus transportation in New York (state)